Egra Sarada Shashi Bhusan College, established in 1968, is one of the oldest college in Purba Medinipur district. It offers undergraduate courses in arts, commerce and sciences. It is affiliated to  Vidyasagar University.

Departments

Science

Chemistry
Physics
Mathematics
Botany
Zoology
Geography

Arts and Commerce

Bengali
English
Sanskrit
History
Political Science
Philosophy
Commerce

Accreditation
In 2002, Egra Sarada Shashi Bhusan College was awarded B grade by the National Assessment and Accreditation Council (NAAC). The college is recognized by the University Grants Commission (UGC).

See also

References

External links
Egra Sarada Shashi Bhusan College
Vidyasagar University
University Grants Commission
National Assessment and Accreditation Council

Colleges affiliated to Vidyasagar University
Educational institutions established in 1968
Universities and colleges in Purba Medinipur district
1968 establishments in West Bengal